The Shanghai Major was a Dota 2 tournament that took place in Shanghai from March 2–6, 2016, and was the second Major of the 2015-2016 professional Dota 2 season. 16 teams competed in the tournament; eight were given direct invitations and the other eight qualified through various qualifying tournament around the world. The Major was won by Team Secret, who defeated Team Liquid in a best of five series 3–1.

The tournament took place at the Mercedes-Benz Arena.

Participating teams
Direct invitation
 Evil Geniuses
 OG
 Team Secret
 Alliance
 Virtus.Pro
 EHOME
 CDEC Gaming
 ViCi Gaming

Regional qualifiers
 LGD Gaming (China)
 Newbee (China)
 Team Archon (Americas)
 compLexity Gaming (Americas)
 Team Liquid (Europe)
 Team Spirit (Europe)
 MVP Phoenix (Southeast Asia)
 Fnatic (Southeast Asia)

Results 
(Note: Prizes are in USD)

Controversy
The Shanghai Major was plagued from the start with technical difficulties and both the production company and host, James "2GD" Harding, were publicly fired on the second day by Gabe Newell in a Reddit post. Despite this, the tournament continued to experience production issues and unexpected delays, as well as less than favorable conditions for the players and broadcasters.

Even after the event finished, controversy persisted. The hotel rooms the teams had stayed in were cleaned out, with a total of 40-50 personal belongings being lost or misplaced, including mice, keyboards, headsets, and car keys.

References

External links

Dota 2 Majors
2016 in esports
2016 in Chinese sport
Sports competitions in Shanghai
Esports competitions in China
March 2016 sports events in China
Perfect World competitions